Leonidio (Katharevousa: Λεωνίδιον, Tsakonian: Αγιελήδι) is a town and a former municipality in Arcadia, Peloponnese, Greece. Since the 2011 local government reform it is part of the municipality South Kynouria, of which it is a municipal unit. The municipal unit has an area of 418.65 km2, the community 102.67 km2. It is considered a traditional settlement.

Name
In the local Tsakonian language, the only surviving descendant of Doric Greek, the town is called Agie Lidi.

Landscape

The town of Leonidio, with a population of 3,826, emerges from a spectacular landscape, bound by two abrupt mountainsides enclosing the town from the north and south. The River Dafnon passes through the town, and its banks are linked with three bridges. The town is capital of the Tsakonia region, notable for its cultural and linguistic particularities, and the settlement itself offers striking and picturesque architecture; now a protected architectural site, there are very strict regulations for building within the town's limits.

Plaka
Plaka is the picturesque port of Leonidio, situated 4 km from the town. It functions mainly with the help of tourism, but a small fishing fleet is also to be found; a well-regarded beach lies 4 km across the shore. The port takes in a number of taverns and bars immediately adjacent to the sea, while every August, it also hosts the "Tsakonian Eggplant Festival", attracting well-known chefs from across Europe and achieving ever-growing popularity.

History

Leonidio is situated near the ancient city of Prasiae, which was an important harbour for Sparta until its ruin by the Athenians during the Peloponnesian War. The ancient Greek traveller Pausanias describes the area as the "garden of Dionysus",  because of the fertility of its plain, and in ancient myth the young Dionysus was found on its beach and later brought up in a cave emerging from it. There is also a second variant of the story, influenced by Christian tradition, recounting the finding of the relics of Saint Leonides atop the beach of Leonidio, where a church was to be built in his honour, remaining to this day; this is a common  suggestion for the derivation of the area's name. During the Middle Ages,  Leonidio found itself used only as a winter refuge for the inhabitants of Prastos, the former capital of Tsakonia. When Prastos was burned to the ground by Ibrahim Pasha during the Greek Revolution, however, its refugees found shelter in Leonidio, protected by the morphology of the landscape. In ensuing years the town flourished and thrived, counting among its residents wealthy merchants and seamen, closely associated with Constantinople and Odessa; during this period beautiful neo-classical house and tower house structures were built within its limits, including the "Tsikaliotis Tower". On January 21, 1949, a major battle of the Greek civil war took place in the town.

Modern Era
Today, Leonidio is a lively and colourful town, especially in summer months, as a result of newly developing tourism. Agriculture, nevertheless, remains a main source of income for its residents, and the benefits of the exploitation of the plain are irreplaceable. The town is also famous for its unusual Easter celebration, when the custom of aerostata (air balloons) attracts spectators. Greek comedy writer Dimitrios Psathas once recommended the virtues of passing: "..carnival in Patras, and Easters in Leonidio".

In late years it has become a well known tourist destination for rock climbing.

Geography
The municipality is situated on the eastern coast of the Peloponnese and, although coastal, opening on to the Myrtoon Sea, it is also mainly mountainous, punctuated by the Parnon. Leonidio town itself, however, is to be found on the area's plain, which proves fertile and very important for the local economy, with its high level of agricultural employment. Apart from citrus fruit, pears, tomatoes and olives, the area's most famous and widely distributed product is the Tsakonian eggplant, characteristic in its sweet taste, and acknowledged and protected by the European Union.  Three old windmills overlook the town.

Geology
Thanks to its position on the mountain of Parnon, the Leonidio municipality is home to a number of  stunning geological formations, such as the Peleta Sinkhole, and the Propantes pothole (a vertical cave).

Demographics
Newly developing tourism is also a vital part of the area, with its scenic, clean beaches and breathtaking mountain scenery. Notably, the area is part of Tsakonia, and the Tsakonian language is still spoken in some areas. Its communities take in the following: Leonidio, Vaskina, Agios Vasileios, Kosmas, Kounoupia, Mari, Paliochori, Paliochora, Peleta, Pigadi, Platanaki, Poulithra, Pragmatefti, Tsitalia, and Vlisidia.

See also
List of settlements in Arcadia
List of traditional settlements of Greece

References

External links

Information about Leonidio 
Info and news about Leonidio 
Info about rock climbing in Leonidio

Populated places in Arcadia, Peloponnese
Tsakonia
Climbing areas of Greece